This is a list of diplomatic missions in Libya. Due to the Libyan Crisis, several countries have closed their embassies in Tripoli.

Diplomatic missions in Tripoli

Embassies

Other missions or delegations 
 (Delegation)

Gallery

Consulates-General / Liaison offices

Benghazi

 (Consulate General)
 (Consulate General)
 (Consulate General)
 (Consulate General)

Misrata
 (Consulate General)

Non-resident embassies

Resident in Algiers, Algeria

Resident in Tunis, Tunisia

 

Resident in Cairo, Egypt

  

Resident in other cities

 (Addis Ababa)
 (Rome)
 (Rome)
 (Riyadh)
 (Stockholm)
 (Rome)

Closed missions

See also
 Foreign relations of Libya
 List of diplomatic missions of Libya
 Visa policy of Libya
 Visa requirements for Libyan citizens

References

Sources 
Libyaonline

 
Diplomatic missions
Libya